Bandits Beware is a 1921 American silent Western film directed by Lee Kohlmar and featuring Hoot Gibson.

Cast
 Hoot Gibson
 Charles Newton
 John Judd
 Marcella Pershing

See also
 List of American films of 1921
 Hoot Gibson filmography

References

External links
 

1921 films
1921 Western (genre) films
1921 short films
American silent short films
American black-and-white films
Films directed by Lee Kohlmar
Silent American Western (genre) films
1920s American films